Clive Roberts (born 19 March 1958) is a British lightweight rower who has sailed for Great Britain in the America's Cup. He won a gold medal at the 1978 FISA Lightweight Championships in Copenhagen with the lightweight men's eight.

References

1958 births
Living people
British male rowers
World Rowing Championships medalists for Great Britain
Rowers at the 1984 Summer Olympics
Olympic rowers of Great Britain